Concepción Úsuga Correra (born 7 February 2001) is a Colombian weightlifter. She won the silver medal in the women's 59kg event at the 2022 Pan American Weightlifting Championships held in Bogotá, Colombia. She won two silver medals at the 2022 Bolivarian Games held in Valledupar, Colombia.

She won the gold medal in the women's 59kg event at the 2021 Junior Pan American Games held in Cali and Valle, Colombia.

She competed in the women's 59kg event at the 2022 World Weightlifting Championships held in Bogotá, Colombia.

Achievements

References

External links 
 

Living people
2001 births
Place of birth missing (living people)
Colombian female weightlifters
Pan American Weightlifting Championships medalists
21st-century Colombian women